Lake Addie is a ghost town in Sumter Township, McLeod County, in the U.S. state of Minnesota.

History
Lake Addie was a small community with a post office. A post office was established at Lake Addie in 1868, and remained in operation until it was discontinued in 1879.

References

Ghost towns in Minnesota
Geography of McLeod County, Minnesota